The 126th Division was a division deployed by the People's Republic of China.

History
The 126th Division was a military formation deployed by the People's Republic of China as part of the People's Volunteer Army (Chinese People's Volunteers (CPV) or Chinese Communist Forces (CCF)) during the Korean War. It had a standard strength of approximately 10,000 men. It was a component of the 42nd Army, consisting of the 376th, 377th, and 378th Regiments.

Current
The division became a PAP unit (1970s-1980s).

References

Infantry divisions of the People's Volunteer Army
Units and formations of the People's Armed Police